The Syracuse Smash were a member of the National Lacrosse League from 1998 to 2000. They were based in Syracuse, New York. The team finished last in the standings each of their three seasons, before moving to Ottawa, Ontario to become the Ottawa Rebel. In their three seasons in the NLL, the Smash never won a game on the road.

All time Record

Schedule

1998 schedule

1999 schedule

References

Defunct National Lacrosse League teams
Lacrosse clubs established in 1998
Lacrosse clubs disestablished in 2000
1998 establishments in New York (state)
2000 disestablishments in New York (state)
Lacrosse teams in New York (state)
Lacrosse in Syracuse, New York